Kathie Browne (September 19, 1929 – April 8, 2003) was an American stage, film and television actress.

Early life 
She was born Jacqueline Sue Browne on September 19, 1929, in Humansville, Missouri, to Winn Roscoe Browne and Erma Mae Wood. Her family later moved to San Luis Obispo, California, then when she turned ten, to Los Angeles, where she went to city schools. She received her first social security card at age 13 during April 1943. After high school, she studied drama at Los Angeles City College (LACC), where she won a best acting award.

Tustin Playbox

May Rose Borum, a drama teacher at LACC, founded a community theatre called the Tustin Playbox in June 1952. As "Cathy Browne" (her first stage name; she does not appear to have used "Kathie Browne" until March 1959), Browne was active in this theater for many years, both as performer and co-producer with her first husband, Sherwood Price.

Career 
In 1955, Browne's television acting career began with her appearance in one episode of Big Town. She appeared in many films and television series, including four roles on Perry Mason: as title character and defendant Donna Loring Ross in the 1960 episode "The Case of the Provocative Protégée", as defendant Susan Fisher in the 1962 episode "The Case of the Mystified Miner", as murderer Carla Eden in the 1963 episode "The Case of the Festive Felon" and as defendant Lona Upton in the 1965 episode "The Case of the Thermal Thief." In 1962, Browne appeared as Laurie Kemper on the TV western Lawman in the episode titled "Heritage of Hate" and as Deela in the 1968 Star Trek episode "Wink of an Eye".

Other television series on which she appeared include:

In 1975 Browne co-starred in the Kolchak: The Night Stalker episode "Sentry", in which her husband, Darren McGavin, starred. She played Chicago P.D. Lieutenant Irene Lamont.

Personal life 
As Jacqueline Sue Browne she married actor-producer Sherwood Price on November 22, 1953, at the Chapman Park Hotel in Los Angeles.

Death
A breast cancer survivor, Browne died of natural causes on April 8, 2003, in Beverly Hills, California. She was 73. She is buried as Kathie Browne-McGavin at Forest Lawn Memorial Park (Hollywood Hills) in Los Angeles County, California. McGavin, to whom she was married for 34 years, died on February 26, 2006, in Los Angeles, California. He was 83. Darren McGavin is interred at the Hollywood Forever Cemetery just 6 miles away.

Filmography

Notes

References

External links
Kathie Browne's Official Website (archived 2009)

 
 
 

1930 births
2003 deaths
Actresses from Los Angeles
American film actresses
American television actresses
Burials at Forest Lawn Memorial Park (Hollywood Hills)
Los Angeles City College alumni
People from San Luis Obispo, California
Western (genre) television actors
20th-century American actresses
21st-century American women